Touchwood is a shopping centre in Solihull, West Midlands, United Kingdom.

History

Opened in 2001 and costing £110 million to build, the centre was built on the former car parks behind the High Street.

Around 251,000 cubic metres of earth were excavated to form the basements and over 4,000 tons support the Touchwood structure.

The most successful retailing area of Solihull, Mell Square and Solihull High Street both now hosting empty units.

The Touchwood access also leads to Library Square, for the Solihull Central Library and Arts Complex.

References

External links
 Official Website

Shopping centres in the West Midlands (county)
Shopping malls established in 2001
Buildings and structures in Solihull